In the Greater Toronto Area, there are 25 incorporated municipalities in either York Region, Halton Region, Peel Region, Durham Region or Toronto. According to the 2021 census, the Greater Toronto Area has a total population of 6,711,985.

List of municipalities

 Inhabitants per km2

Notes

References

Greater Toronto Area